X is the ninth studio album by Fourplay, released in 2006.

Track listing
"Turnabout" (Bob James) – 6:21
"Cinnamon Sugar" (Larry Carlton) – 4:48	
"Eastern Sky" (Marcel East, Nathan East) – 6:37
"Kid Zero" (Harvey Mason, Sr.) – 4:48
"My Love's Leavin'"; feat. Michael McDonald (Vivian Stanshall, Steve Winwood) – 5:11
"Screenplay" (Bob James) – 6:04
"Twilight Touch" (Harvey Mason, Sr.) – 4:57
"Be My Lover" (Larry Carlton, Nathan East) – 4:13
"Sunday Morning" (Nathan East) – 3:53

Personnel 
Fourplay
 Bob James – keyboards
 Larry Carlton – guitars
 Nathan East – bass guitar, vocals (1, 3, 8)
 Harvey Mason – drums

Additional Personnel
 Michael McDonald – vocals (5)
 Kevin DiSimone – backing vocals (5)
 Michele Pillar – vocals (8)

Production 
 Fourplay – producers 
 Ken Freeman – co-producer, recording, mixing, keyboard technician 
 Csaba Petozc – assistant engineer 
 Shannon Forrest – vocal engineer (5)
 Steve Vavagiakis – mastering 
 Rick Wheeler – guitar and bass technician
 Larry Hamby – A&R
 Frank Harkins – art direction 
 Vivian Ng – design
 Michael Waring – photography 
 Sonny Abelardo – management

References 

Fourplay albums
2006 albums